Federal Highway 3 (Fed. 3 ) is a tollfree part of the federal highway corridors. One segment connects Tecate (and California State Route 188 on the US-Mexico border) to Ensenada in Baja California. This segment ends at its junction with Fed. 1 at El Sauzal Rodriguez, just a little north of Ensenada.

This segment of the highway is important because it shortens the distance between the Baja California peninsula and the interior of the country by providing a link with Fed. 2 bypassing Tijuana. It also connects Valle de Guadalupe, San Antonio de las Minas and Valle de Las Palmas.

A second segment of the highway, begins at Fed. 1 in Ensenada and links Ensenada with Fed. 5 near the east coast of the Baja California peninsula. There is a military inspection station just south of the junction, where all passing vehicles in both directions are subject to search.

References

003
Transportation in Baja California